Lu Chia-hung (born 4 March 1997) is a Taiwanese badminton player who joined the national team since he was 12 years old. He competed at the 2014 Summer Youth Olympics. In 2015, Lu was crown as the boys' singles champion at the World Junior Championships.

Personal information 
His brothers Lu Chia-pin and Jia Qian are also professional badminton players.

Achievements

BWF World Junior Championships 
Boys' singles

Asian Junior Championships 
Boys' singles

BWF International Challenge/Series (7 titles, 3 runners-up) 
Men's singles

Men's doubles

  BWF International Challenge tournament
  BWF International Series tournament
  BWF Future Series tournament

References

External links 
 
 

Taiwanese male badminton players
1997 births
Living people
Sportspeople from Kaohsiung
Badminton players at the 2014 Summer Youth Olympics